Dasht-e Bil Rural District is in the Central District of Oshnavieh County, West Azerbaijan province, Iran. At the National Census of 2006, its population was 8,271 in 1,751 households. There were 9,096 inhabitants in 2,394 households at the following census of 2011. At the most recent census of 2016, the population of the rural district was 9,178 in 2,355 households. The largest of its 21 villages was Agh Bolagh, with 1,295 people.

References 

Oshnavieh County

Rural Districts of West Azerbaijan Province

Populated places in West Azerbaijan Province

Populated places in Oshnavieh County